Al-Meshkhab is an Iraqi city and capital of the Al-Meshkhab district situated in the Najaf Governorate, 35 km south of Najaf and 230 km south west of Baghdad. The city is located on the Al-Meshkhab Channel. The majority of the local population consists of Shia Islam belonging to Arabic tribes such as Alzurfy, Muhany and Al-Ghazali. The city was first established as a village in 1916 during the Ottoman Iraq era, promoted to subdistrict then finally upgraded to district capital in 2014.

In 2018 its population was estimated to be north of 140,000.

References

Cities in Iraq
Populated places along the Silk Road
Populated places on the Euphrates River
Populated places in Al-Qādisiyyah Governorate